Homonoia could mean:

Homonoia (plant) - a plant genus of the family Euphorbiaceae comprising 2 species.
Homonoia - a Greek philosophical movement best translated as, being of one mind together
Homonoia (mythology) - Greek goddess of order and unity